The Markkula Center for Applied Ethics at Santa Clara University promotes research and dialogue in ten major ethics focus areas: Bioethics, Business Ethics, Campus Ethics, Government Ethics, Internet Ethics, Journalism and Media Ethics, Leadership Ethics, Religious and Catholic Ethics, Social Sector Ethics, and Technology Ethics.  The Center develops many practical tools, including a framework for ethical decision making, materials for practice-oriented ethics training programs in the technology industry called Ethics in Technology Practice, and several MOOCs on ethics.  The center also offers public talks, workshops, and training in addition to sponsoring activities on the SCU campus for students, faculty, and staff. The center was created by Manuel Velasquez, a faculty member in the school of business.  The center was initially funded with an endowment from Apple Inc. co-founder Mike Markkula and his wife Linda Markkula.

Focus areas

Bioethics
Through partnerships with area hospitals and hospices, the center works in the area of clinical ethics, especially in developing policies on issues such as organ donation after cardiac death and artificial nutrition and hydration. The hospitals also provide the sites for a Health Care Ethics Internship for undergraduates.  The center's bioethics research has focused on "Medical Decision Making for Un-befriended and Unrepresented Patients," "Culturally Competent Care," and "Pandemic Ethics."

Business Ethics 
The center's Business and Organizational Ethics Partnership brings together business executives and business ethics scholars from Santa Clara University and other Bay Area institutions. The partnership is a forum to learn how to create an ethical organizational culture.  It has sponsored research on issues such as "Encouraging Internal Whistle blowing" and "Corporate Moral Responsibility and the Ethics of Product Usage."  The Markkula Center for Applied Ethics also offers programs for boards on directors on assessing the ethical culture of their organizations.

Campus Ethics
More than 70 members of the Santa Clara University faculty are scholars of the Ethics Center with expertise in a variety of fields from literature to engineering.  The center offers both faculty and student Hackworth Grants for research on applied ethics and Hackworth Fellowships for students interested in creating programming on ethics for their peers.  The Campus Ethics Program also organizes presentations on ethics in many applied fields, including technology, diversity, immigration, law, and other topics.

Government Ethics
The center's main focuses in government ethics includes conflicts of interest, gifts and bribes, cronyism, lobbying, transparency, and the personal lives of public officials.  The Center's Ethics Roundtable for locally elected officials convenes mayors, councilpeople, county supervisors, and members of special districts quarterly to discuss how these issues play out in their work.  Former Director of Government Ethics Hana Callaghan died suddenly in January 2020 after her appointment in 2014.

Internet Ethics
With a special focus on privacy, the Ethics Center offers presentations and teaching modules on such topics as data, social media, the "right to be forgotten," cybersecurity, ethics in video games, search engines, and privacy by design.

Journalism & Media Ethics
The Journalism & Media Ethics program area focuses on addressing the ethical implications of how journalistic "gatekeeping" has changed in a digital era. In close collaboration with journalists, editors, and technologists, Journalism & Media Ethics helps members of the public engage with journalists, helps journalists equip themselves with in-depth knowledge on complex issues they cover, and helps stakeholders across the digital ecosystem defuse the rapid spread of misinformation and disinformation that frequently disguises itself as news.

Leadership Ethics
The center works with businesses, nonprofits, governments, and other organizations to analyze real-world issues in leadership ethics and to develop programs and tools to address them.

Religious and Catholic Ethics
As an ethics center in a Jesuit university, there is a special interest in the role of religion in ethics and the formation of moral character.  The center offers dialogue, research, and curriculum across a wide range of religious traditions.

Technology Ethics
The Technology Ethics program area examines issues in the ethics of emerging technologies, providing teaching resources for universities and corporations, and working with organizations such as the Partnership on AI. Some particular areas of focus include AI ethics, space ethics, ethics of human enhancement and transhumanism, and global catastrophic and existential risk.

References

External links
Markkula Center for Applied Ethics

Santa Clara University Centers
Ethics organizations
Educational institutions established in 1986
1986 establishments in California